This is a list in alphabetical order of cricketers who have played for Colts Cricket Club in first-class matches. Where there is an article, the link comes before the club career span, and the scorecard name (typically initials and surname) comes after. If no article is present, the scorecard name comes before the span.

A
 P. Abeygunasekera (1992–93)
 G. N. Abeyratne (1999–2000 to 2003–04)
 Sanka Abeyruwan (2015–16) : S. R. Abeyruwan
 Suchithra Alexander (1993–94 to 2001–02) : S. Alexander
 Ali Khan (2013–14 to 2017–18)
 H. S. H. Alles (1995–96 to 1996–97)
 K. G. Alwitigala (2007–08 to 2013–14)
 Ishara Amerasinghe (1998–99 to 2010–11) : M. K. D. I. Amerasinghe
 M. W. K. Anjula (2017–18 to 2022–23)
 Sahan Arachchige (2015–16 to 2017–18) : S. S. D. Arachchige
 A. S. S. P. A. Attanayake (1994–95 to 2001–02)
 T. P. Attanayake (2006–07 to 2008–09)

B
 Harvir Baidwan
 Vanessa Bowen
 Dhamika Bulankulame

D
 Akila Dananjaya
 Pubudu Dassanayake
 Hemantha Devapriya
 Aruna Dharmasena
 Deshan Dias
 Prasad Dias

E
 Lashan Egalahewa

F
 Riaz Farcy
 Lalithamana Fernando
 Sajith Fernando
 Shehan Fernando
 Wirantha Fernando

G
 Janak Gamage
 Kanchana Gunawardene

H
 Dinuka Hettiarachchi

I
 Krishan Imdika
 Umal Irandika

J
 G. S. Janaka (1996–97 to 2000–01)
 Arosh Janoda (2006–07 to 2007–08) : J. A. Janoda
 Ishan Jayaratne (2008–09 to 2016–17) : H. I. A. Jayaratne
 K. D. Jayashantha (2013–14)
 Angelo Jayasinghe (2013–14 to 2017–18) : A. J. Jayasinghe
 K. S. Jayasinghe (2007–08 to 2009–10)
 G. S. Jayasuriya (2014–15 to 2015–16)
 Prabath Jayasuriya (2015–16 to 2020) : N. G. R. P. Jayasuriya
 Nuwan Jayawardene (1999–2000) : S. N. Jayawardene
 Praveen Jayawickrama (2018–19) :  P. A. Jayawickrama

K
 Romesh Kaluwitharana
 Eshani Kaushalya
 Ali Khan
 Kamran Khan
 Nuwan Kulasekara
 Kaniska Kulasekera
 Jeevantha Kulatunga

L
 A. C. M. Lafir
 Pasindu Lakshanka
 Chamara Lasantha
 Dulip Liyanage

M
 Trevin Mathew
 Angelo Mathews
 Sanitha de Mel
 Chaminda Mendis
 Ishan Mutaliph

P
 Dhanuka Pathirana
 Rashan Peiris
 Bathiya Perera
 Kusal Perera
 Ranesh Perera
 Muthumudalige Pushpakumara
 Viraj Pushpakumara

R
 Bhanuka Rajapaksa
 Vishad Randika

S
 Dulip Samaraweera
 Thilan Samaraweera
 Sachithra Serasinghe
 Mohamed Shiraz
 Gayan de Silva
 Harsha de Silva
 Liyana de Silva
 Roshen Silva
 Roy Silva
 Milinda Siriwardana
 Charith Sudaraka

T
 Nisala Tharaka

U
 Eric Upashantha
 Salindu Ushan

V
 Chaminda Vaas
 Harsha Vithana
 Dilshan Vitharana

W
 Madawa Warnapura
 Malinda Warnapura
 Sajeewa Weerakoon
 Kaushalya Weeraratne
 Thushara Weerasuriya
 Keshan Wijerathne
 Roger Wijesuriya

Z
 Dinesh de Zoysa

References

Colts Cricket Club